Tomáš Jenčo (born 29 September 1988) is a Slovak football goalkeeper who last played for the Slovak Fortuna Liga club FK Pohronie. 

He previously played for Lokomotíva Zvolen, Zemplín Michalovce and Petržalka 1898.

References

External links
MFK Lokomotíva Zvolen official club profile 

Futbalnet profile 

1988 births
Living people
People from Svidník
Sportspeople from the Prešov Region
Slovak footballers
Association football goalkeepers
MŠK Tesla Stropkov players
FC Petržalka players
MFK Zemplín Michalovce players
TJ Baník Ružiná players
MFK Lokomotíva Zvolen players
FK Pohronie players
Slovak Super Liga players
2. Liga (Slovakia) players